This is a list of UNESCO World Heritage Sites in Northern Africa.

Legend 
The list below ignores UNESCO's geopolitical definition of Africa and includes what it describes as sites in the "Arab States". Egypt is included as part of North Africa. The list also comprises a number of sites for which the state party is outside the continent, but the site itself is located in Africa; three such sites are located on the Canary Islands (belonging to Spain), and one on Madeira (belonging to Portugal).

 Site – named after the World Heritage Committee's official designation
 Location – sorted by country, followed by the region at the regional or provincial level. In the case of multinational or multi-regional sites, the names are sorted alphabetically.
 Criteria – as defined by the World Heritage Committee
 Area – in hectares and acres, excluding any buffer zones. A value of zero implies that no data has been published by UNESCO
 Year – during which the site was inscribed to the World Heritage List
 Description – brief information about the site, including reasons for qualifying as an endangered site, if applicable

Sites

See also 
 Lists of World Heritage Sites

References

External links 

 UNESCO World Heritage Centre official website
 UNESCO World Heritage List official website
 VRheritage.org – documentation of World Heritage Sites
 Worldheritage-Forum – Information and weblog on World Heritage issues

Africa

World Heritage
World Heritage Sites
North Africa